Shin Shin (Japanese name: 真真 ;Chinese name: 仙女) is a female giant panda born in 2006 through natural mating in China and settled in Tokyo's Ueno Zoo. She was brought from China and gave birth to a cub, Xiang Xiang, with her mate Ri Ri.

Shin Shin and her partner arrived in Tokyo from China on February 21, 2011. In April, the giant panda made her first public appearance in Japan.

Shin Shin gave birth to twins in June 2021. She also gave birth in 2012 (cub died from pneumonia 5 days later) and 2017.

See also
 Ri Ri

References

2006 animal births
Individual giant pandas
Individual animals in Japan